Punkt International Music Festival or Punktfestivalen has been held every year in Kristiansand, Norway since 2005.

Biography 
Punktfestivalen was established by the musicians Jan Bang and Erik Honoré. They have collaborated from 1980, with the speciality of Bang's live sampling and programming and Honoré's abilities as musician, producer and author. The main objective of the festival is to present experimental music from all over the world and provide innovative musicians an opportunity to share common experiences.

Punktfestival in 2008 included musicians like Gavin Bryars, J. Peter Schwalm, Nik Bärtsch and Jon Hassell. David Sylvian visited the 2013 version of the Punktfestival. In 2014 Laurie Anderson appeared. In addition complicit Norwegian artists like Thom Hell, Arve Henriksen, Håkon Kornstad, Nils Økland, Unni Løvlid, Nils Petter Molvaer, Bugge Wesseltoft and Eivind Aarset.

References

External links 

Music festivals established in 2005

Tourist attractions in Kristiansand
Culture in Agder
Electronic music festivals in Norway
2005 establishments in Norway